Thomas Anthony Tolleson (born January 30, 1943) is a former American football wide receiver who played one season with the Atlanta Falcons of the National Football League (NFL). He was drafted by the Atlanta Falcons in the 15th round of the 1966 NFL Draft. He was also drafted by the New York Jets in the 17th round of the 1966 AFL Draft. Tolleson played college football at the University of Alabama and attended Talladega High School in Talladega, Alabama.

References

External links
Just Sports Stats
College stats

Living people
1943 births
Players of American football from Birmingham, Alabama
American football wide receivers
Alabama Crimson Tide football players
Atlanta Falcons players